William Wilson (November 1915 – after 1936) was an English professional footballer who played as a wing half.

Career
Born in Rotherham, Wilson played for Scarborough, Scunthorpe & Lindsey United, Frickley Colliery, hometown club Rotherham United, Bristol Rovers and Gillingham. In total he made 22 appearances in The Football League.

References

Footballers from Rotherham
1915 births
Year of death missing
English footballers
Scarborough F.C. players
Scunthorpe United F.C. players
Rotherham United F.C. players
Bristol Rovers F.C. players
Gillingham F.C. players
Frickley Athletic F.C. players
English Football League players
Association football wing halves